Events in the year 1928 in Bulgaria.

Incumbents

Events 

 The 1928 Chirpan–Plovdiv earthquakes kills at least 114 people.
 The Sofia Philharmonic was founded.
 August 20 – The Yunak Stadium was opened.

References 

 
1920s in Bulgaria
Years of the 20th century in Bulgaria
Bulgaria
Bulgaria